Abelheira is a village in the Lourinhã Municipality of Portugal.

Abelheira is one of the smallest villages in the Lourinhã Municipality. It has a recreation center, a small grocery store, a café, a church and a cemetery. It also has a nearby beach. Though small, it is a very beautiful town, and most people there are farmers.

Populated places in Lisbon District
Lourinhã